Finkarby is a locality situated in Nykvarn Municipality, Stockholm County, Sweden with 214 inhabitants in 2010.

References 

Populated places in Nykvarn Municipality